Kemnal Technology College is a boys and girls secondary school  located in St Paul's Cray, London, England.

History
The school was first established in 1954 in the former buildings of Chislehurst and Sidcup Grammar School as Cray Valley Technical School. The name was changed to Cray Valley Technical High School in 1968. Later (around 1970) it became Cray Valley Comprehensive, then Kemnal Manor Upper School (around 1977). Kemnal Technology College was converted to academy status in February 2012, and was previously a community school under the direct control of Bromley London Borough Council. The school continues to coordinate with Bromley London Borough Council for admissions. The school has also been designated as a Training school. 

Kemnal suffered a  flood in November and December 2016 which led to the school closing for four days in total: three days in November due to health and safety conditions, and one day at the end of the Christmas term. Remedial works have completed.

Description

Kemnal Technology College offers GCSEs and BTECS as programmes of study for pupils, while sixth form students can choose to study from range of A Levels and additional BTECs. The school also has a specialism in technology, and has additional resources for the specialism.

References

External links
Kemnal Technology College official website

Secondary schools in the London Borough of Bromley
Educational institutions established in 1954
Academies in the London Borough of Bromley
1954 establishments in England
Training schools in England
Boys' schools in London
Buildings and structures in Sidcup